Italian presidential elections are held to elect the President of Italy.

Elections

Provisional head of state 
 1946 Italian presidential election
 1947 Italian presidential election

President of the Republic 
 1948 Italian presidential election
 1955 Italian presidential election
 1962 Italian presidential election
 1964 Italian presidential election
 1971 Italian presidential election
 1978 Italian presidential election
 1985 Italian presidential election
 1992 Italian presidential election
 1999 Italian presidential election
 2006 Italian presidential election
 2013 Italian presidential election
 2015 Italian presidential election
 2022 Italian presidential election

References 

Presidential elections in Italy